New Jack City is a 1991 American action crime film based upon an original story and written by Thomas Lee Wright and Barry Michael Cooper, and directed by Mario Van Peebles in his feature film directorial debut. Released in the United States on March 8, 1991, the film stars Wesley Snipes as Nino Brown, a rising drug lord in New York City during the crack epidemic, and Ice-T as Scotty Appleton, a detective who vows to stop Nino's criminal activity by going undercover to work for Nino's gang. Allen Payne, Chris Rock, Judd Nelson, Bill Cobbs, and Van Peebles appear in supporting roles.

Plot
In the New York City neighborhood of Harlem in 1986, Nino Brown and his gang, the Cash Money Brothers (CMB), become the dominant drug ring in the City once crack cocaine is introduced to the streets. His gang consists of Gerald "Gee Money" Wells, his best friend since childhood; enforcer and personal bodyguard Duh Duh Duh Man; gun moll Keisha; Nino's girlfriend, Selina Thomas; and her tech-savvy cousin, ex-bank teller Kareem Akbar.

Nino converts the Carter apartment complex into a crack house. Gee Money and Keisha kill rival Fat Smitty, the CMB throws out the tenants, and Nino forces the landlord out onto the streets naked. Meanwhile, undercover detective Scotty Appleton attempts to make a deal with stick-up kid Pookie, who absconds with the money. Appleton chases Pookie and shoots him in the leg, but the police release him. Nino's gang successfully run the streets of Harlem over the next three years.

When Det. Stone comes under pressure, Appleton volunteers to infiltrate Nino's gang and is partnered with loose-cannon Nick Peretti. Elsewhere, mobster Frankie Needles attempts to collect taxes from Nino, who refuses to pay. While Appleton and Peretti spy on Nino and his gang as they hand out Thanksgiving turkeys to the poor, Appleton spots Pookie, now a crack addict, as the man beats his junkie girlfriend. Instead of arresting him, Appleton gets Pookie into rehab. Later Pookie offers to help bring down Nino. Against his better judgment and the disapproval of Stone and Peretti, Appleton recruits Pookie as an informant in the Carter.

When Pookie relapses, Gee Money realizes that he is wired and orders the Carter destroyed. The cops find Pookie's bloody and booby-trapped corpse; Peretti defuses the explosives seconds before it explodes. Nino angrily warns Gee Money against repeating such a costly mistake.

After Pookie's funeral and no longer needed by Stone, Appleton, and Peretti go undercover as drug dealers. After bribing Frankie Needles, Appleton infiltrates the CMB, partly due to Gee Money's increasing ambition and drug use. Though Nino distrusts them, he agrees to do business. After relating an anecdote about his own violent initiation into a gang, Nino warns that he will kill both Appleton and Gee Money if any problems occur.

Appleton gains Nino's trust when he reveals information about Gee Money's side deal and saves Nino from the gun-toting Old Man who had earlier appealed to police for help against Nino.  While Nino, Appleton, and the CMB attend a wedding, Peretti sneaks into Nino's mansion to collect evidence.

Don Armeteo sends hitmen to kill Nino, and a massive shootout erupts between the CMB and his hitmen. When Nino uses a child as a shield, Appleton attempts to shoot Nino behind his back. Keisha is killed as she shoots the hitmen's van as they escape. Later, Selina condemns Nino for being a murderer, and Nino throws her out. Nino later kills Don Armeteo and his crew in retribution for the wedding shootout.

Stone, Appleton and Peretti arrange a sting operation to nab Nino. Kareem, aware that Appleton and Pookie were connected, exposes Appleton, and a shootout ensues. Peretti saves Appleton by killing the Duh Duh Duh Man, and Nino escapes. That night, Nino confronts Gee Money, who accuses Nino of egotism, and Nino regretfully kills him. After the gang's collapse, Nino holes up in an apartment and continues his criminal empire solo. Appleton and Peretti assault the complex, and Appleton brutally beats Nino, revealing that it was his mother whom Nino killed in his gang initiation. Peretti dissuades Appleton from killing Nino, who is taken into custody amid threats of retaliation.

At his trial, Nino pleads guilty to a lesser charge, claims to have been forced to help the gang due to threats, and identifies Kareem as the leader. When Nino is sentenced to only a year in jail, Appleton is outraged. As Nino speaks with reporters outside the courtroom, the Old Man again confronts Nino and fatally shoots him in the chest. Appleton and Peretti are both satisfied as Nino falls over the balcony to his death. As onlookers look down at Nino's corpse, an epilogue states to the viewers that decisive action must be taken to stop real-life Nino Brown analogues.

Cast
 Wesley Snipes as Nino Brown, an arrogant, smart drug kingpin who murdered Scotty Appleton's mother in a gang initiation.
 Ice-T as Scotty Appleton, a New York City police detective who vows to avenge his mother's death at Nino's hands. 
 Allen Payne as Gerald "Gee Money" Wells, Nino's childhood friend and the second-in-command of the Cash Money Brothers (CMB).
 Chris Rock as Benny "Pookie" Robinson, a former stick-up kid who becomes homeless and poor after Appleton shoots him in the ankle. Later he becomes a crack addict and eventually a police informant.
 Judd Nelson as Nick Peretti, Appleton's partner in the CMB investigation.
 Mario Van Peebles as Stone, the leader of the CMB police operation.
 Michael Michele as Selina Thomas, Nino Brown's girlfriend, who becomes extremely jealous when Nino falls for Gee Money's girlfriend.
 Bill Nunn as the Duh Duh Duh Man, the CMB enforcer and Nino's personal bodyguard.
 Russell Wong as Park, a tech-savvy police officer who has Pookie use high technology for his infiltration.
 Bill Cobbs as Old Man, an elderly man who opposes Nino's crimes in the city. He shoots and kills Nino as he exits the courtroom, causing Nino to fall to his death.
 Christopher Williams as Kareem Akbar, a bank teller turned gang member of the CMB.
 Vanessa Estelle Williams as Keisha, a female gang member of the CMB.
 Tracy Camilla Johns as Uniqua, Gee Money's ex-girlfriend who falls for Nino.
 Anthony DeSando as Frankie Needles in His Arms, a mobster who has connections with the CMB from his boss, Don Armeteo. Nick and Scotty force him to persuade Gee Money to admit Appleton to the gang.
 Nick Ashford as Reverend Oates
 Keith Sweat as singer at the wedding
 Eek-A-Mouse as a drug-dealing Rastafarian.
 Flavor Flav as a DJ.

Production
The film is based upon an original story and screenplay written by Thomas Lee Wright, who had worked as a story editor at The Walt Disney Company and Columbia Pictures before moving to creative executive at Paramount Pictures.  According to Carl Hart, who corresponded with Wright following Hart's criticism of New Jack City, the screenplay was originally written as The Godfather: Part III, and featured a protagonist who sold heroin rather than cocaine. Wright wrote a treatment for Paramount on the idea, which they liked enough to have him try to do a first draft. Wright based his script to interviews he had with people from Little Italy in New York along with the story of the Black kingpin that had modeled his criminal organization in Harlem after the Mafia in Nicky Barnes. Wright later wrote, directed and produced Eight Tray Gangster: The Making of a Crip, a documentary of gang life in South Central Los Angeles.

The screenplay was co-written by Barry Michael Cooper, a former investigative reporter with the Village Voice who would later write the screenplays for the 1994 dramatic films Above the Rim and Sugar Hill, the latter of which also starred Snipes. Cooper's rewrite was adapted from his December 1987 The Village Voice cover story entitled "Kids Killing Kids: New Jack City Eats Its Young," about the drug war in Detroit. The account referred to the 20th anniversary of the 1967 riots in Detroit, and in its wake, the rise of crack cocaine gangs in the late 1980s, such as Young Boys Inc., and the Chambers Brothers. The original story received notice from Quincy Jones, who sought a meeting with Cooper. He was then tasked with re-writes on a screenplay that had been done about the life of Nicky Barnes.

Filming occurred in New York City between April 16 and June 6, 1990.

Reception

New Jack City was favorably received by film critics for its cast, storyline, and soundtrack.  Roger Ebert of the Chicago Sun-Times gave the film three and a half stars out of four, writing:

Time Out London described the film as "a superior example of what used to be called blaxploitation."

The film initially premiered at the Sundance Film Festival on January 17, 1991, before being released nationally on March 8, 1991. The film, produced with an estimated $8,000,000 budget, grossed $7,039,622 during its opening weekend. It became the highest-grossing independent film of 1991, grossing a total of $47,624,253 domestically. The film holds a 77% on Rotten Tomatoes based on 30 reviews.

American Film Institute Lists
AFI's 100 Years ... 100 Thrills - Nominated
AFI's 10 Top 10 - Nominated Gangster Film

Soundtrack

Home media
The film was released on DVD in Region 1 in the United States on August 25, 1998 and Region 2 in the United Kingdom on July 26, 1999, distributed by Warner Home Video. The film was re-released on DVD as a Two-Disc Special Edition in Region 1 in the United States on August 23, 2005 and Region 2 in the United Kingdom on January 23, 2006.

Special Edition DVD features:
 Commentary by: director and co-star Mario Van Peebles
 New Jack City: A Hip-Hop Classic
 Harlem World: A Walk Inside
 The Road to New Jack City
 Original music videos: "New Jack Hustler" (Nino's Theme) by Ice-T, "I'm Dreamin'" by Christopher Williams, and "I Wanna Sex You Up" by Color Me Badd
 Original theatrical trailer

Cultural influence 

Cooper suggested Teddy Riley name his new genre new jack swing, after the movie.  The New Orleans-based hip hop record label Cash Money Records is named after the Cash Money Brothers gang. Cash Money Records rapper Lil Wayne has a series of albums titled Tha Carter after The Carter Complex, and Lil Wayne and Tyga have referred to themselves as Young Nino. Wrestler New Jack got his name from this movie. Comedian Gary Gulman refers to the movie in his Comedy Central special "In This Economy," when ranting against the now-defunct Blockbuster video stores and their late fee policies.

Reboot
In 2019, Deadline announced that Warner Bros are rebooting the film with Malcolm Mays writing.

Stage play adaptation 
In September of 2022, film producer Je'Caryous Johnson who is a well known stage producer and playwright in the urban market, announced the launching of the stage production adaptation of New Jack City: Live on Stage after his successful adaptation of another film, Set It Off: Live on Stage. The stage play stars Allen Payne, who reprises his role as "Gee Money", Treach as Nino Brown, Flex Alexander as "Pookie", Big Daddy Kane as Stone and Gary Dourdan as Scotty. The stage production's first preview ran October 29-30, 2022 at the Gas South Theater in Atlanta, Georgia and is currently running in a nine-city tour from November of 2022 into February of 2023. Original cast member from the film Christopher Williams who played Kareem Akbar, made a brief curtain call appearance during the Washington D.C. tour stop and performed his hit song from the film's soundtrack, "I'm Dreamin'".

Special arrangements to the stage production was provided by Warner Bros. Theater Ventures.

See also 
 List of hood films

References

External links

 
 
 
 New Jack City official site at WarnerVideo.com
 New Jack City movie review by Janet Maslin for The New York Times (1991)
 Barry Michael (16 March 2011). Cooper, "New Jack, New Jack: Big City of Dreams" for the Baltimore City Paper

1991 films
1991 action thriller films
1991 crime thriller films
1991 directorial debut films
1991 independent films
1990s gang films
1990s hip hop films
African-American films
American action films
American action thriller films
American crime thriller films
American films about revenge
American gang films
American gangster films
American independent films
American neo-noir films
American police detective films
1990s English-language films
Fictional portrayals of the New York City Police Department
Films about African-American organized crime
Films about drugs
Films about murderers
Films about narcissism
Films directed by Mario Van Peebles
Films scored by Michel Colombier
Films set in 1986
Films set in 1989
Films set in 1990
Films set in New York City
Films shot in New Jersey
Films shot in New York City
Hood films
Warner Bros. films
1990s American films